Elberfeld is a municipal subdivision of the German city of Wuppertal; it was an independent town until 1929.

History
The first official mentioning of the geographic area on the banks of today's Wupper River as "elverfelde" was in a document of 1161. Etymologically, elver is derived from the old Low German word for "river." (See etymology of the name of the German Elbe River; cf. North Germanic älv.) Therefore, the original meaning of "elverfelde" can be understood as "field on the river." Elverfelde received its town charter in 1610.

In 1726, Elias Eller and a pastor, Daniel Schleyermacher, founded a Philadelphian society. They later moved to Ronsdorf in the Duchy of Berg, becoming the Zionites, a fringe sect.

In 1826 Friedrich Harkort, a famous German industrialist and politician, had a type of suspension railway built as a trial and ran it on the grounds of what is today the tax office at Elberfeld. In fact the railway, the Schwebebahn Wuppertal, was eventually built between Oberbarmen and Vohwinkel and runs through Elberfeld.

In 1888 the district of Sonnborn was incorporated into Elberfeld. In 1929 the towns of Barmen, Elberfeld, Vohwinkel, Cronenberg and Ronsdorf became a municipal entity officially called "Barmen-Elberfeld;" in the same year, the unified city administration through a vote of its council members decided to rename the newly incorporated city "Wuppertal." This took place in 1930. Today Elberfeld is the largest municipal subdivision of Wuppertal.

Notable people

Greta Bösel (1908–1947), concentration camp guard executed for war crimes
Arno Breker, sculptor
Heinz Thilo, SS war criminal
Werner Eggerath, East German politician
Karl Germer, Outer Head of the Ordo Templi Orientis (1947–1962)
Will Glahé, accordionist, composer, and bandleader
Carl Grossberg, artist
Theodor Hausmann (1880–1972), composer
August von der Heydt (1801–1874), economist
Eduard von der Heydt (1882–1964), banker
Walter Kaufmann (physicist), physicist
Hans Knappertsbusch, conductor
Erich Koch, NSDAP Gauleiter of East Prussia, Reichskommissar of Ukraine
Hermann Friedrich Kohlbrugge, minister
Friedrich Wilhelm Krummacher, minister
Johann Peter Lange, Protestant theologian
Else Lasker-Schüler (1869–1945), poet
Wilhelm Neumann-Torborg, sculptor
Friedrich Philippi, historian
Julius Plücker, mathematician and physicist
Sigurd Raschèr, saxophonist
Paul Ortwin Rave, art historian and director of the Berlin National Gallery
Fritz Roeber (1851–1924), painter
Sir Hans Wolfgang Singer, economist 
Johannes Steele (1908–1988), journalist
Horst Stein (1901–1989), conductor
Horst Tappert (1923–2008), actor
Günter Wand (1912–2002), conductor
Carl Wirths (1897–1955), politician
Sulamith Wülfing, artist

See also
 Elberfeld system

References

Wuppertal
Former municipalities in North Rhine-Westphalia
Districts of the Rhine Province